Reichard is a surname of German origin. Notable people with the surname include:

Christian Gottlieb Reichard (1758–1837), German cartographer
Cody Reichard (born 1987), American ice hockey player
Gladys Reichard (1893–1955), American anthropologist and linguist
Harry Hess Reichard (1878–1956), American German writer and scholar
Heinrich August Ottokar Reichard (1751–1828), German author and theatre director
Joseph Martin Reichard (1803–1872), German politician and revolutionary
Maja Reichard (born 1991), Swedish swimmer
Paul Reichard (1854–1938), German explorer 
Wilhelmine Reichard (1788–1848), German balloonist
Will Reichard (born 2001), American football player

References

Surnames of German origin